The 2002 Sandwell Metropolitan Borough Council election took place on 2 May 2002 to elect members of Sandwell Metropolitan Borough Council in the West Midlands, England. One third of the council was up for election and the Labour Party stayed in overall control of the council.

After the election, the composition of the council was:
Labour 56
Conservative 9
Liberal Democrat 6
Vacant 1

Campaign
Before the election the Labour Party controlled the council with 55 seats, compared to 8 Conservatives, 7 Liberal Democrats and 1 independent. A further seat was vacant after the recent death of Labour councillor Fred Smith.

Candidates in the election included five independents who were standing in protest at a decision by the council to close a swimming pool in Tipton and a nearby leisure centre. The Tipton area also saw 2 candidates from the British National Party standing in the wards of Princes End and Tipton Green.

Election result
The results saw Labour easily keep its strong majority on the council after winning 19 of the 24 seats contested. Neither the British National Party, nor the candidate from the Freedom Party managed to win a seat on the council, but the British National Party did win 24% in Princes End ward.

Ward results

References

2002 English local elections
2002
2000s in the West Midlands (county)